The Bucks County Show is an annual one-day agricultural show held in Buckinghamshire, England established in 1859. In recent years it has been held in Weedon Park, two miles north of Aylesbury on the last Thursday of August. The show is organised by Bucks County Agricultural Association, a registered charity.

History
The show was established in 1859 and was originally known as the Royal and Central Bucks Show following the amalgamation of the Royal Bucks Agricultural Association (obtaining its royal prefix in 1834) and the Central Bucks Agricultural Society.

By 1891 it was called the Royal Bucks Show, and had 5,000 visitors and 670 entries.

Between 1988 and 1952 the show was held in the grounds of Hartwell House. Since 1988 when it has remained at Weedon Park.

Since its inception, the show has been held in various locations including Waddesdon Manor, Walton Grange, Mentmore and Chesham.

The show used to include ploughing matches held at Prebendal Farm, Aylesbury.

The 2014 show was the 147th. There have been breaks in its history due to war and the foot and mouth outbreak in 2001.

References

External links

Agricultural shows in England
August events
Festivals in Buckinghamshire
1859 establishments in England
Festivals established in 1859